The Driving Instruction (Suspension and Exemption Powers) Act 2009 (c 17) is an Act of the Parliament of the United Kingdom. It was passed because it was felt that the minimum of 45 days that it took to remove a person's name from the register of approved driving instructors could create a threat to the safety of members of the public. 

Section 7(3) confers a power on the Secretary of State to bring sections 1 to 4 and Schedules 1 and 2 into force by statutory instrument. When in force, these provisions will create a power to suspend the registration of approved driving instructors. They will insert new sections 124(3) to (5) and 128ZA and 128ZB into the Road Traffic Act 1988.

Sections 5 to 7 came into force at the beginning of 12 November 2009

Section 4(1) of, and Schedule 1 to, this Act will be repealed by Schedule 2 to this Act, when that Schedule is brought into force.

References
Halsbury's Statutes,

External links
The Driving Instruction (Suspension and Exemption Powers) Act 2009, as amended from the National Archives.
The Driving Instruction (Suspension and Exemption Powers) Act 2009, as originally enacted from the National Archives.
Explanatory notes to the Driving Instruction (Suspension and Exemption Powers) Act 2009 prepared by the Department for Transport.

United Kingdom Acts of Parliament 2009